Hincapie–Leomo p/b BMC was an American cycling team focusing on road bicycle racing. The team was developed by former professional racing cyclist George Hincapie, and was managed by Rich Hincapie with assistance from directeur sportif Thomas Craven. The team was founded as a junior development team known as Hincapie–Holowesko Partners. It joined the UCI Continental Tour in partnership with UCI ProTour team  in 2012. Riders who have gone on to compete for UCI WorldTeams and Professional Continental teams include Tanner Putt, Tyler Magner, Joey Rosskopf and Dion Smith.

In November 2017, the team was promoted to UCI Professional Continental status in time for the 2018 season.

The team disbanded at the end of the 2020 season.

Team roster

Major wins

2012
Stage 8a Vuelta a la Independencia Nacional, Tanner Putt
Stage 6 Tour of China I, Tyler Magner
Stage 5 Tour of China II, Oscar Clark
2013
Stage 5 Flèche du Sud, Oscar Clark
 Overall, Paris–Arras Tour, Joey Rosskopf
Stage 1, Joey Rosskopf
Stage 4 Tour de Beauce, Joey Rosskopf
2014
 Overall Tour de Beauce, Toms Skujiņš
Stages 2 & 5, Toms Skujiņš
Stage 2 USA Pro Cycling Challenge, Robin Carpenter
2015
Stage 3 Tour of California, Toms Skujiņš
Overall UCI America Tour, Toms Skujiņš
Winston-Salem Cycling Classic, Toms Skujiņš
Team NRC United States
Individual NRC USA, Toms Skujiņš
2016
Stage 4 Joe Martin Stage Race, Travis McCabe
Stage 2 Tour of Utah, Robin Carpenter
2017
 Overall Joe Martin Stage Race, Robin Carpenter
Stage 4, Robin Carpenter
 Overall Tour de Beauce, Andžs Flaksis
Winston-Salem Cycling Classic, Robin Carpenter
White Spot / Delta Road Race, John Murphy
 Overall Cascade Cycling Classic, Robin Carpenter
Stage 1 Tour of Utah, Tyler Magner
Stage 4 Tour of Utah, John Murphy
Stage 1 Colorado Classic, John Murphy
2018
Stage 1 Tour de Normandie, Fabian Lienhard
Stage 1 Circuit des Ardennes, John Murphy
 Overall Joe Martin Stage Race, Rubén Companioni
Stage 1, Rubén Companioni
Stage 3, Brendan Rhim

References

External links

Cycling teams based in the United States
UCI Continental Teams (America)
Cycling teams established in 2012
Former UCI Professional Continental teams
Defunct cycling teams based in the United States
Cycling teams disestablished in 2020